Bungawalbin is a national park in New South Wales, Australia,  north of Sydney. Originally known as Bungawalbin Nature Reserve, it was granted National Park status in 1999. The Bungawalbin and Yarringully parks together form part of an adjacent wetland system containing important subtropical rainforests in floodplains.

See also
 Protected areas of New South Wales

References

National parks of New South Wales
Protected areas established in 1999
1999 establishments in Australia